Peng Pai (October 22, 1896 – August 30, 1929), training name at youth Peng Hanyu, born in Haifeng, Guangdong Province, China, was a pioneer of the Chinese agrarian movement and peasants' rights activist, a prominent revolutionary, and one of the leaders of Chinese Communist Party (CCP) at its earlier stage.<ref name="PANG">{{cite journal|last=Pang|first=Yong-Pil|title='Peng Pai From Landlord to Revolutionary|journal=Modern China|date=July 1975|volume=1|issue=3|pages=297–322|doi=10.1177/009770047500100303|publisher=SAGE Publications USA|location=Thousand Oaks, CA|s2cid=144289018|issn=0097-7004}}</ref> Peng Pai was one of the few Chinese intellectuals who were aware in the early 1920s that peasantry and land issues caused the most critical problems for Chinese society. He believed that the success of any revolution in China must depend on the peasants as its base foundation. Mao Zedong praised him "the king of peasant movement" (农民运动大王).

Background and early life
Peng Pai was born on October 22, 1896, into an elite Hokkien-speaking landlord and merchant family and an heir to great wealth. The Peng family, with about thirty members, owning lands cultivated by peasant tenants who, with their families, numbered more than 1,500; so each one of the Peng family controlled about fifty peasants.

Peng Pai’s sociopolitical views were partly influenced by his mother, Zhou Feng. Zhou Feng came from an impoverished family. At the age of eighteen, she was sold by her parents as a concubine to Peng Pai’s father Peng Xin (彭辛, another first-name Shou-yin 寿殷). At that time, Peng Xin already had two sons by his first wife. Peng Pai’s mother had three sons of her own: Peng Hanyuan, Peng Pai, and Peng Shu.彭汉垣  Hanyuan and Shu later actively joined and assisted Pai in the peasant movement launched and led by Pai. All three brothers lost their lives for this cause. They are officially honored as "Revolutionary Martyrs" by the People's Republic of China.

In 1916, as a student in the local Haifeng County High School (now named as "Peng Pai Memorial High School" since 1957), Peng Pai became rebellious. He protested against the local gentry’s plan to placate a hostile official by building a statue of this local warlord. 

 Study in Japan (1917–1921) 
Peng Pai went to Japan in 1917 and changed his name from Peng Hanyu. He studied politico-economics after admitted into the Waseda University, Tokyo. There he experienced several historical events of "Aftermath of World War I" that forever changed China and Sino-Japan relations. He witnessed the "Rice Riot" of 1918 in Japan, and was influenced by impact of the 1917's Russian Revolution. In consequence, Peng Pai converted from a Christian to a Socialist. He believed that only socialism, and only complete social, political and economic revolution in the creation of a socialist system, could ensure China's survival.

 Education commissioner of Haifeng (1921–1922) 
Peng Pai finished his study in Japan and returned to his hometown Haifeng in the summer of  1921. He was appointed as the Commissioner of the Education Bureau of Haifeng County in October.   He created new schools, revised the curriculums, and recruited young teachers and principals with pro-socialist ideals.  He organized a May Day celebration parade to the county seat involving his students and "many boys and girls of wealthy families" in 1922.

 Launching and leading peasant movement (1922–1926) 
In the summer of 1922, Peng Pai was dismissed from the Education Commissioner position because of his organizing the May Day parade.  Soon after he left that position, Peng Pai launched and led the peasant revolution movement in Haifeng. He advocated socialism by editing a journal Red Heart Weekly (or Sincere Heart Weekly)  and using a gramophone to play music and songs to gather the villagers and try to convince them to form peasant organizations. To politically awaken peasants and encourage them to fight for their own rights and to liberate themselves from social injustice, Peng Pai burned all the title deeds of his inherited lands in public, and announced to his peasants that the lands they were cultivating henceforth belonged to them.  After such unusual and sincere efforts, he succeeded in forming the first countywide Peasant Association in China, the Haifeng County Peasant Association. The association campaigned for lower rents, led anti-landlord boycotts, and organized welfare activities. He was elected the Association President on New Year’s Day  in 1923. By that time, the Association claimed its membership of about 20,000 families covering 100,000 persons, or one-quarter of the population of the entire county.

In 1924, Peng Pai became a member of  Kuomintang (KMT or Nationalist Party) as individuals and served as the Secretary of Peasant Department of KMT Central Committee, as the KMT-CCP Alliance had been formed since 1923. The KMT was then led by Sun Yat-sen and carried out the policies of "alliance with Soviet Russia, cooperation with the Communists, and assistance to peasant and worker movements". Based on Peng Pai’s idea and suggestion, the KMT Central Committee decided to set up Guangzhou Peasant Movement Training Institute (PMTI) to train young idealists who then went out to educate the masses in rural China.  Peng Pai was the director of the 1st and 5th terms of the PMTI, while Mao Zedong was the director of the 6th term. Peng Pai finished his famous Report on the Haifeng Peasant Movement there and published it in The Chinese Peasants'' in 1926.

A CCP leader establishing the first Soviet in China (1927–1928) 

On April 12, 1927, Chiang Kai-shek and his right wing in the KMT launched the historic incident of "Party purge" or "Shanghai massacre of April 12 Coup". Many prominent Communist and left wing members of the KMT along with tens thousands of the masses suspected pro-CCP were imprisoned or slaughtered. Peng Pai was elected as a member of the CCP Central Committee on the 5th National Congress held in Wuhan during April and May. He was lately appointed as a member of the CCP Front Committee led by Zhou Enlai for organizing and directing the Nanchang Uprising launched on August 1 of that year. He was elected as an alternate-member of CCP Politburo on the August 7th Emergency Meeting of the party. Peng Pai returned to Guangdong following the Nachang Uprising troops, and established the Hai-Lu-Feng Soviet Worker-Peasant-Soldier Government and Territory Base after successful organizing and launching an armed uprising in Haifeng and Lufeng counties in mid November. He was the President of the Hai-Lu-Feng Soviet, the 1st Soviet in Chinese history.  As a reply to the "White Terror" launched on April 12 by Chiang Kai-shek and the KMT, the Hai-Lu-Feng Soviet engaged in a "Red Terror".

In the spring of 1928, less than four months after its inauguration, the Hai-Lu-Feng Soviet was crushed by KMT troops with overwhelming superiority. Peng Pai left Guangdong for Shanghai following CCP Central Committee’s directive.

In July 1928, on the 6th National Congress of the CCP, Peng Pai was elected as a Politburo member and served as the Secretary of the Central Agrarian Movement Committee and a member of the Central Military Affairs Commission of the CCP.

Imprisonment and death  (1929) 
In 1929, Peng Pai was betrayed by his meeting secretary Bai Xin. This led to Peng, Yang Yin and three other CCP leaders being arrested by the KMT government when attending a meeting in Shanghai on August 24. Peng Pai firmly refused to surrender or renounce his beliefs, even under torture, during his imprisonment.  Zhou Enlai, leading the Central Special Task Units (CSTU) of the CCP, organized an action attempting to rescue Peng Pai but this failed. On August 30, Peng Pai was secretly killed at Longhua, Shanghai by the KMT government on the orders of Chiang Kai-shek. On November 11, per Zhou Enlai’s order, Chen Geng and Gu Shunzhang directed the CSTU with its Red Squad to kill Peng's betrayer, Bai Xin, outside of his hidden shelter in Shanghai.

In memory of Peng Pai and Yang Yin, the CCP named its military academy the "Peng-Yang Military Academy of the Red Army".

Bibliography
Report on the Haifeng Peasant Movement (海丰农民运动)
Peng Pai anthology (collection) (彭湃文集)

Family  
Peng Pai's second son, Peng Shilu, the first chief designer of the China's nuclear submarine (Type 091 and Type 092) project, is hailed the "father of China's nuclear submarines" and the "founding father of China's Naval Nuclear Propulsion".   He was selected as a member of the Chinese Academy of Engineering for his contributions and expertise in nuclear propulsion and Nuclear Power Engineering.

Peng Shige, a grandson of Peng Pai's elder brother Peng Hanyuan, is a distinguished mathematician and an academician of the Chinese Academy of Sciences. He is noted for his contributions in stochastic analysis and founding of Mathematical Finance in China.

Cultural Revolution 
During the Chinese Cultural Revolution, the Anti-Peng Pai Incident (反彭湃事件) broke out in Shanwei, Guangdong, targeting the relatives of Peng Pai. Peng Pai's mother was jailed, and his third son Peng Hong (彭洪) was killed and buried secretly; a cousin and a nephew of Peng Pai were also killed in a massacre which resulted in the deaths of over 160 people, and the head of the nephew was hung up on the pole and shown to the public for three days. In 1978 after the end of the Cultural Revolution, Xi Zhongxun (习仲勋) was in charge of Guangdong province and officially redressed this incident as well as rehabilitated Peng Pai's relatives and all the related victims thoroughly.

See also 

 Hailufeng Soviet
 Guangdong Cultural Revolution Massacre

References

1896 births
1929 deaths
Chinese revolutionaries
Chinese Communist Party politicians from Guangdong
Delegates to the 5th National Congress of the Chinese Communist Party
Members of the 6th Central Committee of the Chinese Communist Party
People from Haifeng County
Politicians from Shanwei
Republic of China politicians from Guangdong
Waseda University alumni